When Evening Falls on Bucharest or Metabolism is a 2013 Romanian drama film written and directed by Corneliu Porumboiu. It was screened in the Contemporary World Cinema section at the 2013 Toronto International Film Festival.

Cast
 Diana Avramut
 Bogdan Dumitrache
 Mihaela Sirbu
 Alexandru Papadopol

References

External links
 

2013 films
2013 drama films
Romanian drama films
2010s Romanian-language films
Films directed by Corneliu Porumboiu